A Mask for Alexis is a British television series which originally aired on BBC in 6 episodes between 21 September and 26 October 1959.

Main cast
 David Knight as Christopher March
 Harriette Johns as Elaine Brant
 Edward Cast as Det. Sgt. Edwards
 Barry Steele as PC Courtney
 Gene Anderson as Brenda Carpenter
 Ewen Solon as Det. Insp. Fenner
 Ina De La Haye as  Marguerite Clouzot
 Julian Sherrier as Raven
 Toke Townley as   Paul Weeks

References

Bibliography
 Baskin, Ellen . Serials on British Television, 1950-1994. Scolar Press, 1996.

External links
 

BBC television dramas
1959 British television series debuts
1959 British television series endings
English-language television shows